545 may refer to:

 the year 545 AD
 the year 545 BC
 545, a 2002 live album by Chris Tomlin
 a highway numbered 545 (see list)